Pangapasan is an island situated in the Cebu Strait, a narrow channel between the islands of Cebu and Bohol. This natural ecosystem is rich in marine biodiversity. Most of the resident's livelihood depends on fishing and they sell seafood to nearby markets in Bohol and Metro Cebu.

Government
The island is locally administered by Barangay Pangapasan and under the jurisdiction of the municipality of Tubigon, Bohol

Demographics
Based on the recent 2020 census, the estimated total population of island is 567. The population density is 28,350 persons per square kilometers.

Education
Pangapasan Island has one public elementary school, Pangapasan Elementary School.

Utilities

Electricity

Electricity in Pangapasan Island is being generated by a diesel power station located in the island. The facility is operated by the NAPOCOR - Small Power Utilities Group. The Bohol I Electric Cooperative, Inc. is the distribution utility.

Current Threats
The island has faced the worst tropical cyclone recently, which is Typhoon Rai, or known as Typhoon Odette in the Philippines. With climate change, more frequent and stronger typhoons are expected to make impact on the island. 

The islands of the town of Tubigon, which includes Pangapasan, Batasan, Bilangbilangan and Ubay are experiencing constant flooding and the rising of the sea level especially during high tide. This is caused of the lowering of the surface of the ground or what is called subsidence. This happened after the 7.2 magnitude 2013 Bohol Earthquake.

The island of Pangapasan is the nearest to the main port of Tubigon, among the town's outlying island barangays. Thus, the island is close to the local nautical highway, where ships, including passenger high-speed crafts pass along the route. They create an enormous problem for the residents of Pangapasan, as these ferries create big waves that can be very damaging to houses and structures along the island's shoreline.

See also
 List of islands by population density

References 

Islands of Bohol